Huang Jong-tsun (born 30 March 1947) is a Taiwanese politician and psychologist who serves as the current President of the Examination Yuan. Prior to assuming his current role, Huang had served as President of China Medical University from 2005 to 2014 and Minister of Education from 2002 and 2004. He is the first President of the Examination Yuan not affiliated with any political party.

Biography 
Huang was born to a family in Tianzhong Town of Changhua County on 30 March 1947. He once attended the Jingxiu National School. After graduating from the Yuanlin High School in 1965, he got accepted to the National Taiwan University, where he earned a bachelor's degree. As an undergraduate, he initially studied history, but it was changed to psychology about a year later. He became a professor after university.

Huang entered politics in 1996, the year when he was appointed director for the Ministry of Science and Technology. He was then promoted in February 2002 to Minister of Education, a position he held until 20 May 2004. 

Huang was appointed president of China Medical University in August 2005, having served until 12 February 2014. He resigned following a row during a Legislative Yuan session with Chen Ting-fei, a Democratic Progressive Party lawmaker representing Tainan, over his alleged conflict of interest for assuming chancellorship of the China Medical University months after resigning as Minister of Education. About 500 academics and students from the China Medical University signed a petition pleading Huang to reconsider his decision after he tendered resignation, which the board of directors of the university initially rejected. 

Huang was invited and nominated by President Tsai Ing-wen to serve as President of the Examination Yuan on 29 May 2020. His nomination was confirmed by the Legislative Yuan on 10 July 2020 in a 65-3 vote. Legislators from both the Kuomintang and the Taiwan People's Party boycotted the vote, whereas the New Power Party caucus voted against the nominations. Huang was sworn into office on 1 September 2020.

References 

|-

1947 births
National Taiwan University alumni
Living people
Taiwanese educators
Politicians of the Republic of China on Taiwan from Changhua County
Taiwanese Ministers of Education